The Ascension Factor (1988) is the fourth and final science fiction novel set in the Destination: Void universe by the American author Frank Herbert and poet Bill Ransom. It takes place about twenty five years after The Lazarus Effect. It completes the story of the humans descended from those left by the Voidship Earthling on the planet Pandora approximately 480 years earlier.

Plot summary
As one of three survivors of the orbiting hibernation tanks, a Raja Flattery clone has established himself as "Director" of Pandora. He keeps the Pandorans in an iron grip by heavy food rationing, violently enforced by his security forces. The kelp is being held down by pruning that keeps it from achieving consciousness. The kelp is being remotely controlled from an orbiting space station (The Orbiter), and is used as "Current Control".

The kelp has produced a human-like being, called Crista Galli. She appeared in the water after a kelp bombing, at about age twenty. She doesn't have any memory of being part of the kelp. She has been kept a prisoner by Raja Flattery for several years.

An underground resistance, known as Shadowbox, has been growing. The Shadowbox breaks in on Holovision transmissions, ordinarily dictated by Raja Flattery.

The plan of Raja Flattery is to build a new Voidship, one that will take him away from Pandora. His intention is not to build an artificial intelligence for ship control, but use three OMCs (Organic Mental Core) left in hibernation.

References

1988 American novels
Novels by Frank Herbert
American science fiction novels
Destination: Void universe
1988 science fiction novels
G. P. Putnam's Sons books